Joseph Alexander Kozlowsky (August 9, 1901 – December 22, 1970) was a professional football player who spent 1925 - 1930  in the National Football League with the Boston Bulldogs and the Providence Steam Roller. 

Prior to playing football professionally, Kozlowsky played college football at Boston College. While at Boston College, he was elected captain of the 1924 Eagle football team. In 1971, Kozlowsky was inducted into the Boston College Varsity Club Athletic Hall of Fame.

References

Boston College Bio

1901 births
1970 deaths
Players of American football from Massachusetts
Boston Bulldogs (NFL) players
Providence Steam Roller players
Boston College Eagles football players